HMS Sunderland was a 60-gun fourth rate ship of the line of the Royal Navy, built to the 1719 Establishment at Chatham Dockyard, and launched on 30 April 1724.

On 25 December 1742 Sunderland was ordered to be taken to pieces for rebuilding as a 58-gun fourth rate to the 1741 proposals of the 1719 Establishment at Portsmouth Dockyard, from where she was relaunched on 4 April 1744.

Sunderland sailed from Portsmouth on 6 May 1758, bound for Madras. She sailed in convoy with the 74-gun  and the East Indiaman Pitt.

On 1 January 1761, Sunderland was caught in a cyclone off Pondicherry, India, and foundered. She had been anchored and attempted to go out to sea, but was unable to and so reanchored. The storm overwhelmed her and she foundered six miles north of the anchorage; 376 of her crew died and 17 survived. The same storm claimed four other warships as well.  foundered in much the same manner as Sunderland, and with a similar outcome.

Notes

References

Lavery, Brian (2003) The Ship of the Line - Volume 1: The development of the battlefleet 1650-1850. Conway Maritime Press. .

Ships of the line of the Royal Navy
1720s ships
Ships built in Kent
Maritime incidents in 1761